Revazi Zintiridis (born 1 October 1985 in Georgia) is a Greek judoka.

Achievements

References

External links
 
 

1985 births
Living people
Greek male judoka
Judoka at the 2004 Summer Olympics
Olympic judoka of Greece
21st-century Greek people